Soundwave is a mobile music-discovery startup founded in 2012. Soundwave tracks what songs people are listening to on their smartphones and where in real time. Users can plug into different groups of people and locations to view and listen to trending songs. Soundwave was launched on June 20, 2013.

History 
Soundwave was founded in November, 2011, by Brendan O'Driscoll and Aidan Sliney in Dublin, Ireland. After initial validation studies and customer interviews, the team applied to the National Digital Research Centre Launchpad accelerator program. Soundwave received a place in the fifth iteration of the program that began on February 13, 2012. During the program, Craig Watson joined the founding team. 

In May 2012, the team was awarded first place as the best start-up to graduate from the accelerator program, having been selected as the winner by a panel of four judges.

Launch 
Soundwave was launched worldwide on iPhone and Android on June 20, 2013, in fourteen languages. It has been downloaded in over 180 countries. An updated version was created to coincide with the launch of iOS 7.

On July 17, 2014, Soundwave launched Soundwave 2.0, introducing a new music messenger feature.

Availability 
As of January 2015, Soundwave was available for iOS and Android mobile devices. In 2014, Soundwave announced their availability for Android Wear which allowed users to share music to Twitter, view notifications and follow users back on Soundwave.

References 

Recommender systems
2011 establishments in Ireland